Never Grow Up may refer to:

Never Grow Up (book), 2015 autobiography by Jackie Chan
Never Grow Up, 2017 stand-up comedy special by Bryan Callen

Music

Albums
Never Grow Up, a 2012 album by Mr Hudson
Never Grow Up: Lullabies and Happy Songs, a 2014 charity album by Brooke White
Never Grow Up (EP), by Shane Eagle (2019)

Songs
"Never Grow Up", from Taylor Swift's 2010 album Speak Now
"Never Grow Up", from Svoy's 2011 album Grow Up
"Never Grow Up", from The Alchemist's 2012 album Russian Roulette